The 2011 FIBA Oceania Championship for Men was the 20th edition of the tournament. The tournament featured a three-game series between Australia and New Zealand. Game one was held in Melbourne followed by the second game in Brisbane and game three in Sydney, Australia.

Venues

Squads

Results

References

External links
 FIBA Oceania website

FIBA Oceania Championship
Championship
2011 in New Zealand basketball
2011–12 in Australian basketball
International basketball competitions hosted by Australia
Australia men's national basketball team games
New Zealand men's national basketball team games